Kostas Sakkas is a Greek Anarchist who was charged with belonging to a terrorist group and aggravated possession of weapons after his arrest at a warehouse where arms were found. He was charged with participating in the Conspiracy of Cells of Fire though both he and the CCF deny this. He has been on a hunger strike since June 4, 2013 in protest of his detention for two and a half years without trial.

Reactions of Political Parties

Sakkas' long detention, along with his hunger strike has led the political party Syriza call for his release. In response to this, the New Democracy party stated that "SYRIZA should forget the lessons in democracy" and should "stop defending all kinds of people accused of anarchy and terrorism."

References

Greek anarchists
Living people
1984 births
People from Athens
Hunger strikers